Shannan McPherson (born 12 December 1985 in Sydney, New South Wales) is an Australian former professional rugby league footballer who played in the 2000s and 2010s.  McPherson played with the South Sydney Rabbitohs for seven seasons and then played in the UK for three seasons. He played at either front or second row.

Early life
McPherson was a Souths Junior and played for South Eastern Seagulls growing up.

Playing career
McPherson rose through the ranks, and in 2005, became part of the South Sydney Rabbitohs full-time squad.  McPherson played for South Sydney's feeder club side North Sydney in the 2007 NSWRL premier league grand final against the Parramatta Eels which ended in a 20–15 defeat at Telstra Stadium.

On 29 June 2011, it was announced that McPherson had signed a two-year deal with Welsh outfit Crusaders from the 2012 season. Due to the Crusaders withdrawal from Super League, McPherson's deal fell through. McPherson joined Salford Red Devils on a three-year deal.

On 10 June 2014, Salford owner Marwan Koukash announced the release of McPherson due to his request to return to Australia to be reunited with his wife and three kids, who had returned to Australia the previous Year.

On 3 September 2014, it was released that McPherson had signed with the Parramatta Eels for the 2015 season.

References

External links
NRL profile

1985 births
Australian rugby league players
Australian people of Russian descent
Salford Red Devils players
South Sydney Rabbitohs players
North Sydney Bears NSW Cup players
Rugby league props
Living people
Rugby league players from Sydney